Jacqueline Manny (born December 29, 1987)  is an American former professional soccer defender who last played for the Chicago Red Stars of the National Women's Soccer League.

Early life
Santacaterina was raised in Geneva, Illinois, where she attended Geneva High School and finished her high school career with 49 goals and 47 assists in 70 games, all as midfielder for the Lady Vikings. In 2005, she helped lead Geneva to a third-place finish in Illinois class AA and was named Kane County Player of the Year. She earned Suburban Prairie North Conference MVP honors in 2004 and 2005 and was listed as a Top 150 recruit by Soccer Buzz.

Santacaterina helped lead the club soccer team, Eclipse Select, to consecutive United States Youth Soccer Association (USYSA) national championships in 2004 and 2005 followed by a Region II title in 2006. As a member of the Illinois state Olympic Development Program (ODP) team from 2000 to 2005, she helped guide the squad to a second-place national finish in 2005. Santacaterina also earned All-State honors in 2004 and 2005.

University of Illinois
Santacaterina attended the University of Illinois where she played for the Fighting Illini from 2006 to 2009. During her freshman year, she was named to the Big Ten All-Freshman team, Top Drawer Soccer's All-Rookie first team, Soccer Buzz's Great Lakes Region All-Freshman team and the All-Illini Tournament team. In 2007, she started in all 21 matches and was named to the Soccer Buzz All-Great Lakes Region second team and All-Big Ten second team. During her junior season, she started all 23 matches and was named to the All-Big Ten second team. During her final season, she was named team Co-MVP and was one of 11 Illini to register at least 1,000 minutes of play.

Playing career

Club

Chicago Red Stars
In 2013, Santacaterina was selected in the fourth round (28th overall) of the 2013 NWSL Supplemental Draft by the Chicago Red Stars for the inaugural season of the National Women's Soccer League.

Following the 2014 NWSL season, Santacaterina announced her retirement, citing inability to recover from a soccer injury.

References

External links
 Chicago Red Stars player profile 

1987 births
Living people
American women's soccer players
Chicago Red Stars players
Illinois Fighting Illini women's soccer players
Women's association football defenders
Soccer players from Illinois
National Women's Soccer League players
Women's Premier Soccer League players
Women's Premier Soccer League Elite players